The 3rd Infantry Division Sustainment Brigade is a sustainment brigade of the United States Army headquartered at Fort Stewart, Georgia. The 3rd Sustainment Brigade is responsible for providing logistical support to the 3rd Infantry Division, however the modular nature of the brigade means that it takes on other roles while deployed.

Though its lineage dates back to 1957, the unit was not designated as a separate unit until 2005. The 3rd Sustainment Brigade has served three tours in Iraq in support of Operation Iraqi Freedom, its first tour being the initial invasion and securing of the country, followed by a second tour of duty as logistics support for units around Baghdad, and finally as the multinational division supply lines in the northern division of the country.

The Brigade left for a planned nine-month deployment to Afghanistan in late November 2012.

Organization
The 3rd Sustainment Brigade has a permanent organization of two attached battalions, however this number can be changed when the unit is deployed in a theater of operations. These permanent attachments include the 87th Combat Sustainment Support Battalion (87th CSSB), and a Special Troops Battalion (STB). The units are headquartered at Fort Stewart. Georgia, along with the brigade's Headquarters and Headquarters Company (HHC). Under non-deployment circumstances, the HHC of the Brigade would, in turn, be directly subordinate to the 3rd Infantry Division.

History

The unit was constituted 1 July 1957 in the regular army as Headquarters and Headquarters Detachment, 3rd Infantry Division Trains, and activated at Fort Benning, Georgia. On 20 March 1963, the unit was consolidated with the 3rd Infantry Division Band, which has previously been organized in 1943 as the band, 3rd Infantry Division. On 15 March 1968, the unit was re-organized and re-designed as Headquarters and Headquarters Company and Band, 3rd Infantry Division Support Command. On 21 May 1972, the unit was re-organized and re-designed as Headquarters and Headquarters Company, 3rd Infantry Division Support Command. It was deployed to as part of the Cold War buildup, should hostilities arise in the region with the Soviet Union. Though the unit was placed on alert constantly, it never saw action during its time in the region, which lasted from its activation until 1991.

In the fall of 2002, the Division Support Command deployed in support of Operation Iraqi Freedom I, earning the Presidential Unit Citation along with the rest of the 3rd Infantry Division. The Brigade and its division had spearheaded the invasion into the nation of Iraq, supporting the four brigades as they pushed through southern Iraq and into the capital of Baghdad. After the initial invasion and capture of Baghdad, the brigade remained in the city, supporting the 3rd Infantry Division as the unit conducted counterinsurgency and infrastructure activities in the area. It returned home to Fort Stewart in August 2003.

The Division Support Command was renamed the Division Support Brigade and deployed to Iraq in the fall of 2004 in support of Operation Iraqi Freedom III, leading coalition troops in control of the Baghdad area. Under Multinational Division, Baghdad. It returned home again in January 2006. The Division Support Brigade was reorganized as the 3rd Support Brigade on 15 June 2005, and re-designated as the 3rd Sustainment Brigade on 21 April 2006.

In 2007, the Brigade saw its third deployment to Iraq during the Iraq War, relieving the 45th Sustainment Brigade of its areas of responsibility of Multinational Division, North, comprising over a dozen Forward Operating Bases. The Brigade deployed to Iraq in fall of 2007 following the Brigade Combat Teams and aviation brigade of the 3rd Infantry Division, however, for this deployment, the unit did not support the Division directly, as its mission in Multinational Division, North covered facilities management, not unit logistics. Brigade projects focused on building infrastructure throughout northern Iraq. The brigade served a total of 15 months in the country, headquartered at Contingency Operating Base Q-West in Northern Iraq under the command of the 316th Expeditionary Support Command. It was relieved during a change of command ceremony on 9 August 2008, at which time it returned to Fort Stewart. It was replaced by the 16th Sustainment Brigade. Since its return, the brigade participated in an intramural soccer tournament at Fort Benning, something many of its members enjoyed doing, even while deployed.

In late November 2012 the Brigade deployed to Afghanistan for its first tour in support of Operation Enduring Freedom in Afghanistan.

In September 2014, the brigade deployed a sixth time to Camp Arifjan, Kuwait, to support sustainment and retrograde operations in seven middle eastern countries.

In October, 2017, the brigade and Special Troops Battalion headquarters deployed to Bagram Airfield, Afghanistan, to support Operation Resolute Support, taking on the role of the 3rd Infantry Division Resolute Support Sustainment Brigade. During their planned 9-month tour they will oversee all logistics operations inside Afghanistan.

Honors

Unit Decorations

Campaign streamers

References

External links
 3rd Infantry Division Homepage: 3rd Sustainment Brigade
 The Institute of Heraldry: 3rd Sustainment Brigade

003
Military units and formations established in 2006
Military units and formations disestablished in 2015